The International Space Station Environmental Control and Life Support System (ECLSS) is a life support system that provides or controls atmospheric pressure, fire detection and suppression, oxygen levels, waste management and water supply. The highest priority for the ECLSS is the ISS atmosphere, but the system also collects, processes, and stores both waste and water produced and used by the crew—a process that recycles fluid from the sink, shower, toilet, and condensation from the air.

The Elektron system aboard Zvezda and a similar system in Destiny generate oxygen aboard the station.
The crew has a backup option in the form of bottled oxygen and Solid Fuel Oxygen Generation (SFOG) canisters.
Carbon dioxide is removed from the air by the Vozdukh system in Zvezda, one Carbon Dioxide Removal Assembly (CDRA) located in the U.S. Lab module, and one CDRA in the U.S. Node 3 module. Other by-products of human metabolism, such as methane from flatulence and ammonia from sweat, are removed by activated charcoal filters or by the Trace Contaminant Control System (TCCS).

Water recovery systems 
The ISS has two water recovery systems. Zvezda contains a water recovery system that processes water vapor from the atmosphere that could be used for drinking in an emergency but is normally fed to the Elektron system to produce oxygen. The American segment has a Water Recovery System installed during STS-126 that can process water vapour collected from the atmosphere and urine into water that is intended for drinking. The Water Recovery System was installed initially in Destiny on a temporary basis in November 2008 and moved into Tranquility (Node 3) in February 2010.

The Water Recovery System consists of a Urine Processor Assembly and a Water Processor Assembly, housed in two of the three ECLSS racks.

The Urine Processor Assembly uses a low pressure vacuum distillation process that uses a centrifuge to compensate for the lack of gravity and thus aid in separating liquids and gasses. The Urine Processor Assembly is designed to handle a load of 9 kg/day, corresponding to the needs of a 6-person crew. Although the design called for recovery of 85% of the water content, subsequent experience with calcium sulfate precipitation (in the free-fall conditions present on the ISS, calcium levels in urine are elevated due to bone density loss) has led to a revised operational level of recovering 70% of the water content.

Water from the Urine Processor Assembly and from waste water sources are combined to feed the Water Processor Assembly that filters out gasses and solid materials before passing through filter beds and then a high-temperature catalytic reactor assembly. The water is then tested by onboard sensors and unacceptable water is cycled back through the water processor assembly.

The Volatile Removal Assembly flew on STS-89 in January 1998 to demonstrate the Water Processor Assembly's catalytic reactor in microgravity. A Vapour Compression Distillation Flight Experiment flew, but was destroyed, in STS-107.

The distillation assembly of the Urine Processor Assembly failed on 21 November 2008, one day after the initial installation. One of the three centrifuge speed sensors was reporting anomalous speeds, and high centrifuge motor current was observed. This was corrected by re-mounting the distillation assembly without several rubber vibration isolators. The distillation assembly failed again on 28 December 2008 due to high motor current and was replaced on 20 March 2009. Ultimately, during post-failure testing, one centrifuge speed sensor was found to be out of alignment and a compressor bearing had failed.

Atmosphere 
Several systems are currently used on board the ISS to maintain the spacecraft's atmosphere, which is similar to the Earth's. Normal air pressure on the ISS is 101.3 kPa (14.7 psi); the same as at sea level on Earth. "While members of the ISS crew could stay healthy even with the pressure at a lower level, the equipment on the Station is very sensitive to pressure. If the pressure were to drop too far, it could cause problems with the Station equipment.".

Air revitalization system 
Carbon dioxide and trace contaminants are removed by the Air Revitalization System. This is a NASA rack, placed in Tranquility, designed to provide a Carbon Dioxide Removal Assembly (CDRA), a Trace Contaminant Control Subassembly (TCCS) to remove hazardous trace contamination from the atmosphere and a Major Constituent Analyser (MCA) to monitor nitrogen, oxygen, carbon dioxide, methane, hydrogen, and water vapour. The Air Revitalization System was flown to the station aboard STS-128 and was temporarily installed in the Japanese Experiment Module pressurised module. The system was scheduled to be transferred to Tranquility after it arrived and was installed during Space Shuttle Endeavour mission STS-130.

Oxygen generating system 
The Oxygen Generating System (OGS) is a NASA rack designed to electrolyse water from the Water Recovery System to produce oxygen and hydrogen. The oxygen is delivered to the cabin atmosphere.  The unit is installed in the Destiny module. During one of the spacewalks conducted by STS-117 astronauts, a hydrogen vent valve required to begin using the system was installed. The system was delivered in 2006 by STS-121, and became operational on 12 July 2007. From 2001, the US orbital segment had used oxygen in a pressurized storage tank on the Quest airlock module, or from the Russian service module. Prior to the activation of the Sabatier System in October 2010 hydrogen and carbon dioxide extracted from the cabin was vented overboard.

In 2011, American news outlet CBS news and news magazine spaceflightnow reported "The OGA over the past six months has not been running well because the water that's been fed to it is just slightly too acidic," said station Flight Director Chris Edelen. "For the past several months, the station crew has been using oxygen brought up aboard visiting Progress supply spacecraft, a European cargo craft and the Russian Elektron oxygen generator while awaiting delivery of the OGA repair equipment. The OGA, like the Elektron, uses electricity to split water molecules into hydrogen and oxygen. "

The Advanced Closed Loop System (ACLS) is an ESA rack that converts carbon dioxide into oxygen and water. This is very different from the NASA oxygen-generating rack that is reliant on a steady supply of water from Earth in order to generate oxygen. This water-producing capability will save the need to launch an extra 400 liters of water in cargo resupply per year. 50% of the carbon dioxide that it processes can be converted to oxygen and by itself it can make enough oxygen full-time for 3 astronauts. The other 50% of carbon dioxide is jettisoned from the ISS along with the methane that is created. ACLS has three subsystems :
 The Carbon dioxide Concentration Assembly (CCA) uses an amine reaction to absorb and concentrate carbon dioxide from cabin air to keep carbon dioxide within acceptable levels.
 The Oxygen Generation Assembly (OGA), an electrolyser that separates water into oxygen and hydrogen.
 the Carbon dioxide Reprocessing Assembly (CRA). A ‘Sabatier reactor’ reacts  from CCA with hydrogen from the OGA to produce water and methane.
The ACLS is a technology demonstrator (planned to operate from 1 to 2 years) but if it is successful it will be left on board the ISS permanently. It was delivered on the Kounotori 7 launch in September 2018 and installed in the Destiny module.
A year after delivery, most of it was working and new parts were expected to get all three subsystems fully functional in 2020.

Sabatier system 
The NASA Sabatier system, since 2010, closes the oxygen loop in the ECLSS by combining waste hydrogen from the Oxygen generating system and carbon dioxide from the station atmosphere using the Sabatier reaction to reuse the oxygen.  The outputs of this reaction are water, and methane.  The water is recycled to reduce the total amount of water that must be carried to the station from Earth, and the methane is vented overboard by the now shared hydrogen vent line installed for the Oxygen generating system.

Elektron 

Elektron is a Russian Electrolytic Oxygen Generator, which was also used on Mir. It uses electrolysis to produce oxygen. This process splits water molecules reclaimed from other uses on board the station into oxygen and hydrogen via electrolysis. The oxygen is vented into the cabin and the hydrogen is vented into space. The three Russian Elektron oxygen generators on board the International Space Station have been plagued with problems, frequently forcing the crew to use backup sources (either bottled oxygen or the Vika system discussed below). To support a crew of six, NASA added the oxygen generating system discussed above.

In 2004, the Elektron unit shut down due to (initially) unknown causes. Two weeks of troubleshooting resulted in the unit starting up again, then immediately shutting down. The cause was eventually traced to gas bubbles in the unit, which remained non-functional until a Progress resupply mission in October 2004. In 2005 ISS personnel tapped into the oxygen supply of the recently arrived Progress resupply spacecraft, when the Elektron unit failed. In 2006 fumes from a malfunctioning Elektron unit prompted NASA flight engineers to declare a "spacecraft emergency". A burning smell led the ISS crew to suspect another Elektron fire, but the unit was only "very hot". A leak of corrosive, odorless potassium hydroxide forced the ISS crew to don gloves and face masks. It has been conjectured that the smell came from overheated rubber seals. The incident occurred shortly after STS-115 left and just before arrival of a resupply mission (including space tourist Anousheh Ansari). The Elektron did not come back online until November 2006, after new valves and cables arrived on the October 2006 Progress resupply vessel. The ERPTC (Electrical Recovery Processing Terminal Current) was inserted into the ISS to prevent harm to the systems. In October 2020 the Elektron system failed and had to be deactivated for a short time before being repaired.

Vika 

The Vika or TGK oxygen generator, also known as Solid Fuel Oxygen Generation (SFOG) when used on the ISS, is a chemical oxygen generator originally developed by Roscosmos for Mir, and it provides an alternate oxygen generating system. It uses canisters of solid lithium perchlorate, which are burned to create gaseous oxygen. Each canister can supply the oxygen needs of one crewmember for one day.

Vozdukh 
Another Russian system, Vozdukh (Russian Воздух, meaning "air"), removes carbon dioxide from the air based on the use of regenerable absorbers of carbon dioxide gas.

Temperature and Humidity Control 

Temperature and Humidity Control (THC) is the subsystem of the ISS ECLSS concerned with the maintenance of a steady air temperature and the control of the moisture in the station's air supply. Thermal Control System (TCS) is a component part of the THC system and subdivides into the Active Thermal Control System (ATCS) and Passive Thermal Control System (PTCS). Controlling humidity is possible through lowering or raising the temperature and through adding moisture to the air.

Fire Detection and Suppression 

Fire Detection and Suppression (FDS) is the subsystem devoted to identifying that there has been a fire and taking steps to fight 
it.

See also 

 International Space Station maintenance

References

External links

Components of the International Space Station
Medical technology
Spacecraft life support systems